Hart Independent School District is a public school district based in Hart, Texas (USA).

The district has two campuses - Hart Junior/Senior High (Grades 7-12) and Hart Elementary (Grades PK-6).

In 2009, the school district was rated "academically acceptable" by the Texas Education Agency.

References

External links
Hart ISD

School districts in Castro County, Texas